Amyntas, son of Alexander from Mieza and brother of Macedonian general Peucestas, was appointed somatophylax of Philip III Arrhidaeus at Triparadisus in 320 BC. This appointment suggests that Antipater trusted Peucestas more than he did Peithon.

References 

Who's who in the age of Alexander the Great: prosopography of Alexander's empire  

Somatophylakes
Ancient Greek generals
Ancient Macedonian generals
4th-century BC Greek people
Ancient Miezans